Lille-Europe station (French: Gare de Lille-Europe) is a SNCF railway station in Lille, France, on the LGV Nord high-speed railway. The station is primarily used for international Eurostar and long-distance SNCF TGV services, although some high-speed regional trains also call at the station.
The station was built in 1993 to be used as a through station for trains between the UK, Belgium, and the Netherlands, as well as French TGV services, except those coming from Paris which normally terminate at Lille-Flandres. There is a  walking distance between the two stations, which are also adjacent stops on the Lille Metro.

Connections
For travellers from the United Kingdom to destinations not served directly by Eurostar, connections are available here on trains towards Disneyland Paris, Charles de Gaulle International Airport, Lyon, Valence, then Avignon, Aix-en-Provence, Marseille St. Charles (and also on to Cannes and Nice); and Nîmes, Montpellier and Perpignan.

After the 'Additional Protocol to the Sangatte Protocol' was signed by France and the United Kingdom on 29 May 2000, juxtaposed controls were set up in the station. Eurostar passengers travelling to the UK clear exit checks from the Schengen Area (carried out by the French Border Police) as well as UK entry checks (conducted by the UK Border Force) in the station before boarding their train.

Train services
The following services call at Lille Europe:

International high-speed services (Eurostar) London – Lille – Brussels – Amsterdam
International high-speed services (Eurostar) London – Lille – Marne-la-Vallée (Disneyland Paris)
International high-speed services (Thalys) Amsterdam – Rotterdam – Antwerp – Brussels – Lille
High-speed services (TGV) Calais – Lille – Paris
High-speed services (TGV) (Rang-du-Fliers -) Boulogne – Calais – Lille – Paris
High-speed services (TGV) Dunkerque – Lille – Paris
High-speed services (TGV) Lille – Aéroport CDG – Lyon – Marseille
High-speed services (TGV) Lille – Aéroport CDG – Lyon – Nîmes – Montpellier
High-speed services (TGV) Lille – Aéroport CDG – Tours – Poitiers – Bordeaux
High-speed services (TGV) Lille – Aéroport CDG – Le Mans – Rennes
High-speed services (TGV) Lille – Aéroport CDG – Le Mans – Angers – Nantes
High-speed services (TGV) Lille – Arras – Aéroport CDG – Lyon – Nîmes – Montpellier
High-speed services (TGV) Lille – Arras – Aéroport CDG – Lyon – Marseille
International high-speed services (TGV) Brussels – Lille – Aéroport CDG – Lyon – Marseille
International high-speed services (TGV) Brussels – Lille – Aéroport CDG – Lyon – Nîmes – Montpellier – Perpignan
High-speed regional services (TER GV) Dunkirk – Lille
High-speed regional services (TER GV) Rang-du-Fliers – Boulogne – Calais – Lille

Ouibus
Since 23 July 2012, SNCF's international coach network, Ouibus, serves Lille Europe.

Coach services from Lille are:
Paris – Lille
Paris – Lille – Brussels
Paris – Lille – Amsterdam
Paris – Lille – London

See also
 Lille-Flandres station

Notes

References

External links 
 

Transport in Lille
Buildings and structures in Lille
Lille-Europe
Railway stations in Nord (French department)
Railway stations in France opened in 1994
French railway stations with juxtaposed controls